"Love... Thy Will Be Done" is the first single released from American singer and actress Martika's second album, Martika's Kitchen (1991). The Prince-produced single, written by Martika and Prince, was released on July 25, 1991, and reached the top 10 on the charts of seven countries, including Australia, where it peaked at number one in October 1991. The song's black-and-white music video was directed by Michael Haussman.

Background
This song introduced Martika to a more adult contemporary sound than her previous efforts. The song is particularly remarkable for its constant backline, played by the drums and the bass, without any variation throughout the song, neither as far as rhythm or intensity are concerned, independently of other effects in the song (climax, forte, piano, backing vocals, etc.). Similarly, the melody insists particularly on monochord lines and repeats the "love thy will be done" notes as a leitmotif. According to an article in the online magazine Pitchfork, the song "almost certainly" contains a sample of "Fifty-Fifty Clown" by Scottish band Cocteau Twins.

Track listings
7-inch single
 "Love... Thy Will Be Done" – 4:20
 "Mi tierra" – 4:34

CD maxi
 "Love... Thy Will Be Done" – 4:20
 "Mi tierra" – 4:35
 "Temptation" – 4:45

CD single
 "Love... Thy Will Be Done" – 4:20
 "Mi tierra" – 4:34

Cassette
 "Love... Thy Will Be Done" – 4:20
 "Mi tierra" – 4:34

Charts and certifications

Weekly charts

Year-end charts

Certifications

Release history

Covers and samples
Prince performed this song during his tours in the later 1990s and in 2012. He also used a sample of it for his cover of "One of Us" on his album Emancipation. Prince's original version was released on his posthumous album Originals in 2019. Singer Jessie Ware released a cover version in April 2013, and singer Delta Goodrem released a cover version in September 2014.

Delta Goodrem version

In 2014, Australian singer/songwriter Delta Goodrem released a version to promote her Australia and New Zealand tour with opera singer Andrea Bocelli. It was announced on her Twitter account just days before the release. It was released on iTunes and Google Play as a digital download and at JB Hi-Fi and Sanity as a CD single. Pre-orders from Sanity came with a limited edition 'D' keyring. The CD single also includes a cover of Shakespears Sister's song "Stay".

Track listings
Digital download
 "Love Thy Will Be Done" – 4:02

CD single
 "Love Thy Will Be Done" – 4:02
 "Stay" – 3:50

Charts

References

1991 singles
1991 songs
Columbia Records singles
Delta Goodrem songs
Martika songs
Music videos directed by Michael Haussman
Number-one singles in Australia
Song recordings produced by Prince (musician)
Songs written by Martika
Songs written by Prince (musician)